The Trillium Gift of Life Network was an agency of the Government of Ontario responsible for the province's organ donation strategy, promotion, and supply. Ronnie Gavsie was the President & CEO. The agency maintained the popular BeADonor.ca website. It was subsequently subsumed under Ontario Health in 2019.

Statistics

Statistics can be a great way to see the reasons behind needing certain registries in a country. The following are statistics on the wait-list and the transplants performed in Canada in 2008, 2009, and 2010.  The data is from the Canadian Institute for Health Information that focuses on British Columbia, Alberta, Saskatchewan, Manitoba, Ontario, Quebec, and Nova Scotia.

From 2001 to 2010, kidney and liver waitlists decreased, respectively by 330 and 27 patients.  The pancreas waitlist, however, increased by 24 patients since 2001.  Heart, lung, and heart with lungs remained moderately stable.  These trends are indicated in the Organ wait-list by organ for 2001 to 2010.  Transplants from 2001 to 2010, however, indicated an increased trend by 275 operations in deceased and living kidney, kidney pancreas, deceased and living liver, heart and lung transplants.  Heart with lung transplants remained stable.  These trends are indicated in the Organ transplant by organ for 2001 to 2010.

Canadian organ wait-list
Looking at the statistics for Canada, one can see that there has been an increase in the number of people waiting for a transplant between 2009 and 2010, while between 2008 and 2009 there was a decrease in the number of people on the wait-list.

Ontario organ transplants
Since 2008 there has been a steady increase of people receiving transplants. Comparing the number of transplants performed to the number of people waiting in 2010, there are twice as many people waiting then there is transplants being performed. This may be a sign of what is to come in future years. If the wait-list continues to increase at a faster rate than the number of transplants performed, the demand is not going to meet the supply.

References

External links

Medical and health organizations based in Ontario
Organ donation
Ontario government departments and agencies